Will John (born John Oluremi William; June 13, 1985) is an American soccer player who currently plays for 2 Hnl side NK Jarun. He is also called GOLUREMI. His YouTube channel has over 832,000 subscribers.

Early life
William John played high school soccer at Rockhurst High School in Kansas City, Missouri. William currently holds the Rockhurst single season scoring title with 36 goals and 20 assists. He played also besides his High school career, club soccer for Kansas City Attack. John played college soccer at Saint Louis University, and in the USL Premier Development League for Kansas City Brass.

Career

Club
William was drafted by the Chicago Fire in the second round of the 2005 MLS SuperDraft and Led the team in scoring in the Lamar Hunt US Open Cup. After a season with the Fire, William was traded to the Kansas City Wizards for Diego Gutierrez.

In January 2008, William moved to Danish Superliga side Randers, signing a 1-year contract. On 7 August 2008, Randers announced that William had agreed to personal terms and joined Serbian SuperLiga team Čukarički Stankom.

In February 2009 Will signed a contract with MŠK Žilina after agreeing to personal terms with the club. However, his former club Čukarički withheld his registration papers and he was forced to leave the club. William subsequently joined NK Vinogradar.

In February 2013 William signed for Azerbaijan Premier League side AZAL on a two-year contract. He became the first American to play and score in the Azerbaijan Premier League. William came on as a substitute for AZAL in their 3–0 victory against Kəpəz on 24 February 2013. John scored his first goal for AZAL on 3 March 2013 in a home victory over Gabala. William's consecutive goal scoring run was abruptly ended by a slight meniscus tear against Khazar Lankaran. The subsequent surgery saw William miss the remainder of the season.

The 2013–2014 season saw William establish himself as one of the most notable and skillful players in the Azerbaijan Premier League. He became the first player in the league's history to win 3 "Goal of the month awards" in the same season. With 8 goals and 5 assists he was AZAL's leading goal scorer. John is most commonly known in Azerbaijan as Con Oluremi.

After leaving AZAL, William signed for Moroccan Botola side MAS Fez in September 2014. However, in January 2015 William left MAS Fez citing unpaid wages, with a proposed move to League of Ireland powerhouse Shamrock Rovers falling through in February 2015. In August 2015, John signed for Veikkausliiga side RoPS. On September 14, 2015, William's two goals in a win against KTP propelled RoPS to top of the table for the first time in over 25 years. William was awarded Man of the Match for his performance.  In March 2016, William signed a new contract with RoPS.

On 13 September 2018, Locomotive Tbilisi announced the signing of John on a contract until the end of the 2020 season.

On September 23, 2021, NK Jarun announced the signing of John. He made his league debut in a match against NK Sesvete on December 4, 2021, a game in which Jarun won 4–3.

International
William was part of the U-14, U-16 Youth National Teams as well as the U.S. Under-20 team at the 2005 FIFA World Youth Championship. As of June 2009 William is eligible for selection by both the Nigerian and US National teams due to the new FIFA Regulations.

William John serves on the United States Soccer Federation's Athlete Council which is a group of twenty athletes who are elected by their peers. The purpose of the council as laid out in U.S. Soccer's bylaws is to provide a broader means of communication between Athletes and the Federation and make reports and recommendations to the Board of Directors about matters affecting Athletes.

In 2018 William was named U.S Soccer Foundation Ambassador. The mission of the U.S. Soccer Foundation is to enhance, assist and grow the sport of soccer in the United States, with a special emphasis on underserved communities.

Career statistics

Media

YouTube
In 2016, Will started his own YouTube channel that now has over 832,000 subscribers worldwide and 78 million views. His 21-day challenge has now been viewed by over 12 million people and marked his initial surge into the platform. He speaks at least nine languages, including Swedish, Croatian, Italian, Danish, German, Italian, French, Bosnian, and Russian, which he showcases on his Goluremi Languages YouTube channel.

References

External links

1985 births
Living people
Sportspeople from Overland Park, Kansas
Soccer players from Kansas
Association football midfielders
United States men's youth international soccer players
United States men's under-20 international soccer players
American soccer players
American expatriate soccer players
Saint Louis Billikens men's soccer players
Kansas City Brass players
Chicago Fire FC players
Sporting Kansas City players
USL League Two players
Major League Soccer players
Randers FC players
Danish Superliga players
Expatriate men's footballers in Denmark
American expatriate sportspeople in Denmark
FK Čukarički players
Serbian SuperLiga players
Expatriate footballers in Serbia
American expatriate sportspeople in Serbia
NK Vinogradar players
Expatriate footballers in Croatia
American expatriate sportspeople in Croatia
F.C. Ashdod players
Israeli Premier League players
Expatriate footballers in Israel
American expatriate sportspeople in Israel
Missouri Comets players
Major Indoor Soccer League (2008–2014) players
Chicago Fire FC draft picks
FC Lokomotivi Tbilisi players
Erovnuli Liga players
Expatriate footballers in Georgia (country)
American YouTubers